Nordberg Church is a parish church of the Church of Norway in Skjåk Municipality in Innlandet county, Norway. It is located in the village of Nordberg. It is the church for the Nordberg parish which is part of the Nord-Gudbrandsdal prosti (deanery) in the Diocese of Hamar. The brown, wooden church was built in an octagonal design in 1864 using plans drawn up by the architect Jacob Wilhelm Nordan. The church seats about 215 people.

History

Planning for a new church in Nordberg began around 1860. The architect Jacob Wilhelm Nordan was hired to design the new building and Jakob Jonsen Storlien was hired as the lead builder. The church was designed as an octagonal building with a small church porch in the west and a sacristy in the east. The church was built from 1862-1864 and it was consecrated in 1864.

See also
List of churches in Hamar

References

Skjåk
Churches in Innlandet
Octagonal churches in Norway
Wooden churches in Norway
19th-century Church of Norway church buildings
Churches completed in 1864
1864 establishments in Norway